Borgen is a village in the municipality of Ullensaker, Norway. Its population on 1 January 1 2020 was 1,343. Borgen has both soccer and handball teams. In recent years, Borgen has started to grow. Usually, new families move to Borgen because of its good environment and proximity to the city.

References

Villages in Akershus
Ullensaker